Chirodactylus jessicalenorum, the natal fingerfin, is a species of ray-finned fish within the family Cheilodactylidae. It is found in the Indian Ocean off the coast of South Africa, at depths of 3 to 20 meters below sea level.

Biology 
Chirodactylus jessicalenorum can grow to a maximum length of 50 centimeters, although it is more commonly found at a length of 30 centimeters. Its body is scarlet in coloring, with a redish black blotch at the pectoral base. It lives in rocky banks off shore lines, where it feeds on small invertabrates such as worms, crabs, and mollusks, although it can occasionally eat squid and small fish as well.

Conservation 
Chirodactylus jessicalenorum is faces minor commercial importance, as it is mainly caught through the use of spears where it is then sold fresh in local fish markets. It also faces bycatch and is a game fish, although it isn't known how much these impact the overall population.

No conservation efforts have been made so far, and its range likely already overlaps with several marine protected areas in South Africa. It has been classified as 'Data deficient' by the IUCN Red List, as more information is needed to fully understand its current population and impact from fishing.

References 

Fish described in 1980
Fish of South Africa
Fish of the Indian Ocean
Chirodactylus
IUCN Red List data deficient species